Lorraine Dille Williams is an American businesswoman. She was hired as manager of TSR, Inc. by company co-founder Gary Gygax in 1984, and was in charge of the gaming company from 1986 to 1997. Williams gained control of TSR in October 1985 when the Blume brothers sold her their controlling shares of the company. In 1996, an unexpectedly high cost of returned (unsold) fiction books and an expensive, unsuccessful foray into the collectible card game market caused a cash flow squeeze, and Williams sold TSR to Wizards of the Coast in 1997.

Williams inherited the rights to Buck Rogers and a large collection of Buck Rogers memorabilia. She sold the memorabilia at auction in 2010.

Early life
Lorraine Williams is the granddaughter of John F. Dille who, while president of the National Newspaper Service syndicate in the 1920s, arranged for Buck Rogers to be turned into a syndicated comic strip. After Dille's death in 1957, ownership of Buck Rogers and other works passed into the Dille Family Trust through the Dille family trust, making Williams one of the beneficiaries of the Buck Rogers franchise. The Dille family retained the licensing of Buck Rogers, as well as a collection of Buck Rogers memorabilia that John F. Dille had accumulated over thirty years.

Williams attended the University of California at Berkeley, where she earned a B.A. in history. After graduating, she worked at the National Newspaper Syndicate. She then became an assistant administrator at the Rush-Presbyterian-St. Luke's Medical Center. Later, she joined the National Easter Seal Society, where she worked as an administrator.

TSR

Brought into TSR by Gary Gygax
Gary Gygax, co-inventor of the role-playing game Dungeons & Dragons and partner in the company TSR, had been sent to Hollywood in 1982 to work on licensing the Dungeons & Dragons brand, leaving the day-to-day operations of TSR to his fellow board members, Kevin and Brian Blume. While in Hollywood, he was involved in the making of the Dungeons & Dragons animated television show and exploring the possibility of a film adaptation of the game. In the course of his work, Gygax met Flint Dille, with whom he collaborated on a series of choose-your-own-adventure-type novels and a script for an unmade Dungeons & Dragons film. In 1984, Gygax was alerted to the fact that TSR was $1.5 million in debt and the Blumes were looking for a buyer. In an attempt to bring new investment money into the company, Gygax asked Flint Dille to arrange a meeting with his sister, Lorraine Williams.

Although Williams turned down Gygax's invitation to invest in TSR, Gygax did hire her, on the basis of her management experience, to manage TSR. Williams was able to deal with TSR's creditors and get money flowing back into the company again. Gygax subsequently engineered the removal of Kevin Blume as CEO due to fiscal mismanagement. However, Kevin's brother Brian had a longstanding stock option which he triggered; both brothers then sold their stock to Williams, making her the majority shareholder. Gygax considered trying to fire Williams in order to replace her with his future wife, Gail Carpenter, but was advised not to. Gygax did go to court to have the sale of stock declared illegal, claiming he had a verbal agreement with the Blume brothers to buy their stock. When the judge ruled against him, Gygax sold his remaining stock and left TSR.

In control of TSR
Williams was a financial planner who saw the potential for transforming the company into a highly profitable one. However, she supposedly disdained gaming, viewing herself as superior to gamers. Former TSR employee Mike Breault has stated that he does not recall a rumored ban by Williams on playing games in the company during his time in TSR, but does go on to say that the vast majority of the products were not playtested.

Upon leaving TSR, Gygax had founded New Infinities Productions, Inc., and subsequently developed a new fantasy role-playing game, spanning multiple genres, called Dangerous Journeys. When the product was released by Game Designers' Workshop, Williams immediately sued, claiming that the game infringed TSR's intellectual property. The suit was eventually settled out of court, with TSR buying the complete rights to the Dangerous Journeys system from New Infinities and then permanently shelving the entire project. With no product to sell, Gygax's new company was driven out of business.

Under Williams's direction, TSR initially maintained its leadership position in role-playing games, and solidified its expansion into other fields, such as magazines, paperback fiction, and comic books. Through her family, Williams personally held the rights to the Buck Rogers license and encouraged TSR to produce Buck Rogers games and novels. In 1988 she edited Buck Rogers: The First 60 Years in the 25th Century. TSR also published a Buck Rogers board game, a Buck Rogers XXVC role-playing game based on the AD&D 2nd Edition rules, over a dozen supplements for the role-playing game, comic books (1990–1991), a line of 11 novels and graphic novels (1989–1993), and two computer games produced by SSI (1990–1992). As Williams' family owned Buck Rogers, TSR paid them royalties on the character.

Downfall of TSR
During the 1980s, TSR was the top games company in North America. However, in the early 1990s, TSR fell behind both Games Workshop and Wizards of the Coast in terms of sales volume. Seeing the profits being generated by Wizards of the Coast with their collectible card game Magic: The Gathering, TSR attempted to enter this market in 1996 in a novel way with Dragon Dice, a game that used packs of collectible dice instead of cards. In addition, despite a history of publishing only one or two hardcover novels each year, TSR also decided to publish twelve novels in 1996.

Sales of Dragon Dice through the games trade started strongly, so TSR quickly produced several expansion packs. In addition, TSR tried to aggressively market Dragon Dice in mass-market book stores through Random House. However, Dragon Dice did not catch on through the book trade, and sales of the expansion sets through traditional games stores sold poorly. In addition, the twelve hardcover novels did not sell as well as expected. Despite total sales of $40 million, TSR ended 1996 with few cash reserves. When Random House returned an unexpectedly high percentage of the year's inventory of unsold novels and Dragon Dice for a fee of several million dollars, TSR found itself in a cash crunch.

With no cash available, TSR was unable to pay their printing and shipping bills, and the logistics company that handled TSR's pre-press, printing, warehousing, and shipping refused to do any more work. Since the logistics company had the production plates for key products such as core D&D books, there was no means of printing or shipping core products in order to generate income or secure short-term financing.

Bob Abramowitz of Five Rings Publishing Group met with Williams and was able to negotiate and secure an option to purchase TSR, using funding from Wizards of the Coast. With no viable financial plan for TSR's survival, Williams sold the company to Wizards of the Coast in 1997.

Auction of Buck Rogers collection
In August 2010, Williams announced that she was selling what she described as the world's largest collection of Buck Rogers original comic art, prototypes, toys, books, and collectibles. This was material she had helped her father to catalog and pack up many years before. She said at the time of the announcement that her instinct had been to hold on to everything, but she had come to realize that it was more important to get the collection out into the public. The pieces of the collection were subsequently sold at auction on August 28, 2010.

Buck Rogers Lawsuit
In 2017, Williams advanced $250,000 to fund a trademark lawsuit between the Dille Family Trust and the Nowlan Family Trust (who represented the estate of Philip Francis Nowlan, the creator of "Buck Rogers") over who owned the rights to the "Buck Rogers" character. In February 2019 the Dille Family Trust (DFT) entered into a Settlement Agreement with the Nowlan Family Trust selling the Trust's assets and assigning all their intellectual property rights to Buck Rogers to the Nowlan Family Trust; US District Court for the Eastern District of Pennsylvania Civil Action NO 15-6231 case dismissed with prejudice on March 4, 2019.

References

External links
 "Buck Rogers" official website—The Dille Family Trust (Wayback Machine)

Year of birth missing (living people)
Living people
American businesspeople
UC Berkeley College of Letters and Science alumni